Master of the World can refer to:

Master of the World (novel), a 1904 novel by Jules Verne
Master of the World (1961 film), a film loosely connected to the novel 
Master of the World (1934 film), a German science fiction film 
Master of the World (comics), a Marvel comics character

See also
Masters of the World, a government simulation game by Eversim